Events from the year 1725 in Scotland.

Incumbents 

 Secretary of State for Scotland: The Duke of Roxburghe, until August; office vacant thereafter

Law officers 
 Lord Advocate – Robert Dundas, then Duncan Forbes
 Solicitor General for Scotland – John Sinclair, jointly with Charles Binning; then John Sinclair, jointly with Charles Erskine

Judiciary 
 Lord President of the Court of Session – Lord North Berwick
 Lord Justice General – Lord Ilay
 Lord Justice Clerk – Lord Grange

Events 
 12 May – the Black Watch is raised as a military company as part of the pacification of the Highlands under General George Wade.
 22 June – malt riots in Glasgow against higher taxes on Scottish malt used in the production of distilled beverages. Wade's troops enter the city.
 August – John Ker, 1st Duke of Roxburghe, resigns as Secretary of State for Scotland; the post remains vacant until 1742.
 A second Disarming Act is passed as part of the pacification of the Highlands.
 Mining of minerals at Strontian begins.
 One of the earliest examples of a steam pump in Scotland is installed for draining coal mines at Edmonstone in Midlothian.
 Barony of Calton, including Calton Hill, purchased by the city of Edinburgh.
 James Anderson of Stobcross House feues out land near Glasgow for weavers cottages; the area is named Anderson Town in his honour, later becoming Anderston.

Births 
 6 March – Henry Benedict Stuart, cardinal and Jacobite claimant to the British throne (born, and died 1807, in Italy)
 17 March – Lachlan McIntosh, military and political leader in America (died 1806 in the United States)
 10 November – John Hope, physician and botanist (died 1786)

Deaths 
 8 October – Sir William Scott of Thirlestane, lawyer and neo-Latin poet (born 1645)
 Alexander Nisbet, heraldist (born 1657)

The arts
 Poet James Thomson moves to London.
 Allan Ramsay publishes The Gentle Shepherd: A Scots pastoral comedy.
 William Thomson compiles Orpheus Caledonius: or a Collection of the Best Scotch Songs.

See also 

 Timeline of Scottish history

References 

 
Years of the 18th century in Scotland
Scotland
1720s in Scotland